The IDS Center is an office skyscraper located at 80 South 8th Street in Minneapolis, Minnesota. The structure rises to  when including communications spires on the roof, indisputably the highest points in the city. The IDS was constructed as the headquarters of Investors Diversified Services, Inc.—now Ameriprise Financial. It also housed the headquarters of Dayton Hudson Corporation (now Target Corporation) from 1972 until 2001.

The complex consists of five parts: the 57-story IDS Tower itself at 8th Street & Nicollet Mall, an 8-story annex building along Marquette Avenue, the 19-story Marquette Hotel at 7th Street & Marquette Avenue, and a 2-story retail building that was originally dominated by Woolworth's. These four buildings are joined by the 7-story Crystal Court.

The 57-story IDS became the tallest skyscraper in Minneapolis when it surpassed the height of the 32-story Foshay Tower in 1972, ending that building's 43-year reign over the city skyline. Construction of the building was followed with great interest, and the topping-off ceremony was a major civic event in the city. In addition to being taller, IDS occupies a much larger footprint than the obelisk-like Foshay.

Design and environment
A lobby and shopping area at the bottom of the tower is known as the Crystal Court, and provides skyway connections between the tower and four adjacent blocks. The Concourse level is occupied by Globe College and University; originally this floor was an extension of the Crystal Court retail space and included a single-screen movie theater and shops. The building had a 51st floor observation deck until 1984. Thousands of people came for one last visit on December 31, 1983. This floor is now office space. The 50th Floor contained an east-facing "Orion Room" restaurant, a north-facing bar and cocktail lounge, a private south-facing dining club ("Tower Club"), all which were converted to office space. The west-facing "University of Minnesota Alumni Club" closed to the public in 1994. Today, the entire 50th floor consists of four large ballrooms with a single central kitchen. The rooms are collectively known as "Windows on Minnesota," and they serve as banquet space for the Marquette Hotel.

Because of the IDS Center's peculiar and unique stepback design, termed "zogs" by its architect, Philip Johnson, each floor has up to 32 corner offices. The area of Nicollet Mall in front of the IDS Center is familiar to television viewers: The character of Mary Richards on The Mary Tyler Moore Show was seen on Nicollet Mall looking at an IDS shop in the opening montage of the show. Across South 7th Street from the IDS was Donaldson's Department Store in front of which she tossed her hat in the air at the end of the opening sequence. A statue commemorating that shot stands approximately at the camera location of the view, created and maintained by TVLand. She is also seen in the show opening dining with then-husband Grant Tinker at what is now the terrace of Basil's Restaurant on the hotel's third floor overlooking the Crystal Court, where diners can sit at the "Mary Tyler Moore Table."

The IDS Tower has an 8-story annex extending along the Marquette Avenue side of the building. This building is a true annex; the 4th through 8th floors can only be reached through the IDS Tower elevators. The 3rd floor can only be reached through the Marquette Hotel elevators.

The building has not been without structural problems. Since soon after its construction, the Crystal Court had issues with water leaking through the roof after rain or snow due to effects of Minnesota's extreme freeze-thaw cycle. There are also frequent problems in the winter when ice falls from the tower and onto the court's glass roof panels, often breaking through. Occasionally the court will be roped off to prevent injury to the public. The Center and Crystal Court were devastated by a summer wind storm in June 1979 that led to much glass breakage. The entire Crystal Court was sealed off by plywood barriers while this was repaired.

The battle for tallest status

However, the height had been increased due to an engineering need, according to Tom O'Mara, one of the construction managers at the time of Capella Tower construction. There were some ventilation ducts near the roof that required about 14 more inches (36 cm) of height.

In the years following completion, the actual height eventually became known as it was published in almanacs and other listings of building height. The owners of the Capella Tower were hesitant to claim that their building was taller than IDS, and usually deferred the honor to the more well-known structure. As area journalists reported on the sale of the IDS Center to the John Buck Company in 2004 and the death of designer Philip Johnson in 2005, they came face-to-face with the fact that the roof of the tower was one foot lower than its neighbor.

Emporis.com restored the IDS Center to first-place status in the city in February 2005 by including the height of the window-washing garage, although that has not completely ended the dispute. A spokesperson for the Council on Tall Buildings and Urban Habitat, which sometimes handles height disputes, stated that it would be unlikely for the garage to be included in the official height because many would not consider it to be an integral part of the building's design.

It is unclear if the height of the Capella Tower reaches to the top of the "halo" surrounding the screen walls (walls designed to hide cooling towers on the roof), so the height of the flat roof might be somewhat shorter, or that building might similarly be able to add to its height by including the additional structure. Presently, the IDS is considered to be  taller than the former First Bank Tower.

It is also important to note that height measurements are sometimes incorrectly reported due to conversion from U.S. customary units to the metric system and back again. It is the highest building in Minnesota currently since 1972.

Mechanical floors
The building has two mechanical floors between the 8th and 9th floor and two mechanical floors between 51 and the roof level. They are known as 8A, 8B and 51A, 51B. They are not accessible from any of the building's passenger elevators and contain HVAC equipment. As a result, the 9th floor is really the 11th floor and the 51st floor is really 53rd. This can be seen from the outside of the building or by walking down the stairwell from the 9th floor or higher. There is also a floor 2A which is inaccessible except from the freight elevators. There are also three floors beneath the IDS called P1, P2, and P3. These are storage levels for tenants and also are connected to the parking ramp below the IDS. Neither 2A, or P's 1, 2, and 3 are counted as actual floors. Half of the space of the complex (floors 9 to 57 of the Tower) is located above the 8th floor and half (including the retail, hotel, and floors 1 to 8 of the Tower and annex building) is located below the 8th floor.

Ownership
The building was purchased by the John Buck Company in December 2004 for US$225 million. Just over a year later in January 2006, the company began looking for new buyers. In August 2006 it was sold to The Inland Real Estate Group of Companies, Inc., for approximately $277 million. Beacon Investment Properties of Hallandale Beach, FL purchased the building from Inland in April 2013 for approximately $253 million.

Broadcasting
A number of major FM radio stations which formerly broadcast from the site now use the IDS as a backup in case their primary location in Shoreview, Minnesota were to fail. One of the most notable broadcasters was 99.5 WLOL until the pop format signed off in late February 1991. In fact, one well-known reference was "From the top-top-top of the IDS Center, 99 and 1/2 WLOL Minneapolis-Saint Paul!" In 2009 the equipment was removed and digital towers were added for the national digital switch. Some television broadcasters using the towers include Univision affiliate WUMN-LD and KMBD-LD, which broadcasts HSN programming, while the area's major television stations use them for their STL towers and microwave relays to Shoreview and their studios and live trucks.

FM

Television

Tenants
The tower is leased to smaller businesses. The IDS has 1.4 million square feet (120,000 m²) of office and retail space. Tenants include:

 Taft
 Gray Plant Mooty
 Dady & Gardner, P.A.
 Hubert White
 Lindquist & Vennum
 Merchant & Gould
 U.S. Bancorp
Hall Law

Owners of IDS Center 

 Investor's Diversified Services (Now Ameriprise Financial) 1972-1981 Construction cost US$13.5 million
 Oxford Development 1981-2004. Purchase price US$200 million
 John Buck Company 2004-2006. Purchase price US$225 million
 Inland American Real Estate Trust Inc 2006-2013. Purchase price US$277 million
 Beacon Investment Properties (Now Accesso Partners, LLC)   2013-Present. Purchase price $253 million. 
 Joint Venture with Harel Insurance Investments & Financial Services Ltd & Menora Mivtahim Insurance Ltd., both based in Tel Aviv.

In popular culture
 Mary Tyler Moore's character was shown dining in Basil's Restaurant overlooking the Crystal Court in the introduction to The Mary Tyler Moore Show; it was not known as "Basil's" during that time.
 The Crystal Court is featured in the video of Hüsker Dü's cover of the Mary Tyler Moore Show theme song.
 The building was briefly mentioned by Steve Buscemi in Fargo - "IDS Building, the big glass one, tallest skyscraper in the Midwest after the Sears - uh, Chicago...John Hancock building whatever..."
 The building appeared in Remy Zero's music video, "Save Me."
 The Hold Steady's song "Party Pit" (off their album Boys and Girls in America) contains the lyrics, "I saw her walking through the Crystal Court./She made a scene by the revolving doors."
 David Treuer's novel The Hiawatha describes the role of American-Indian labor in building the tower.
 In the movie Purple Rain, Prince is seen looking in the window of a store on the Skyway Level of the Crystal Court.
 In the movie Monty Python's The Meaning of Life and the short film The Crimson Permanent Assurance, the IDS Tower is among a group of buildings creating a large financial district.
 In an establishing shot from the movie Shazam!, the IDS Tower stands in for Doctor Sivana's business headquarters.

Deadly falls 
There have been three deaths as a result of falls from the IDS Tower, one by accident and two by suicide. In 2007, Fidel Danilo Sanchez-Flores, a worker removing snow from the IDS Center's Crystal Court roof, slipped and fell three stories through the glass canopied atrium to his death.

In 2001, a 30-year-old man jumped to his death from the 51st floor, crashed through the Crystal Court, and landed by the fountain near Basil's restaurant. In 1996, a 32-year-old man knocked out a window in the 30th floor of the IDS Center and jumped to his death.

See also
 List of tallest buildings by U.S. state
 List of tallest buildings in Minnesota

References

 Katherine Glover (May 2004). Public Icon, Private Property. The Rake.
 Rick Bronson (February 17, 2005). IDS Tower restored to tallest status. Emporis.com.
 Business Wire (August 21, 2006).

External links

 
 Emporis.com: IDS Tower
 IDS Tower photos

Skyscraper office buildings in Minneapolis
Philip Johnson buildings
John Burgee buildings
Postmodern architecture in the United States
Target Corporation
Office buildings completed in 1974
1974 establishments in Minnesota